Isalo II, also known as the Makay Formation, is an informal Triassic geological unit in Madagascar.

It is described as "thick beds of mottled red or green clays associated with soft cross-bedded sandstones, light in colour and much finer-grained than the Isalo I sandstones." It is prominent in the Makay Massif.

Fossil content

Amphibians

Reptiles

Synapsids

References 

Geologic formations of Madagascar
Triassic System of Africa
Triassic Madagascar
Ladinian Stage
Carnian Stage
Sandstone formations
Mudstone formations
Paleontology in Madagascar